Qindu District, is a district of the city of Xianyang, Shaanxi province, China.

Administrative divisions
As 2016, this District is divided to 5 subdistricts and 7 towns.
Subdistricts

Towns

Climate

References

Districts of Shaanxi
Xianyang